Euarestoides rionegrensis is a species of fruit fly in the family Tephritidae.

Distribution
Colombia.

References

Tephritinae
Insects described in 2019
Diptera of South America